The 1973 San Diego Padres season was the fifth season in franchise history.

Offseason
 December 27, 1972: Curt Blefary was released by the Padres.
 January 10, 1973: Dave Wehrmeister was drafted by the Padres in the 1st round (3rd pick) of the 1973 Major League Baseball draft.

Regular season

Dave Winfield
Dave Winfield came to the Padres in 1973 from the University of Minnesota without having played a single game in the minor leagues. Winfield was also drafted by the Minnesota Vikings of the National Football League, the Atlanta Hawks of the National Basketball Association and the Utah Stars of the American Basketball Association. Winfield made his Major League Baseball debut on June 19 against the Houston Astros. Winfield had 4 at bats and 1 hit.

Season standings

Record vs. opponents

Opening Day starters
Nate Colbert
Bob Davis
Cito Gaston
Johnny Grubb
Enzo Hernández
Dave Hilton
Clay Kirby
Leron Lee
Dave Roberts

Notable transactions
 June 5, 1973: Dave Winfield was drafted by the San Diego Padres in the 1st round (4th pick) of the 1973 Major League Baseball draft.
 June 12, 1973: Fred Norman was traded by the Padres to the Cincinnati Reds for Gene Locklear and Mike Johnson.

Roster

Player stats

Batting

Starters by position
Note: Pos = Position; G = Games played; AB = At bats; H = Hits; Avg. = Batting average; HR = Home runs; RBI = Runs batted in

Other batters
Note: G = Games played; AB = At bats; H = Hits; Avg. = Batting average; HR = Home runs; RBI = Runs batted in

Pitching

Starting pitchers
Note: G = Games pitched; IP = Innings pitched; W = Wins; L = Losses; ERA = Earned run average; SO = Strikeouts

Other pitchers
Note: G = Games pitched; IP = Innings pitched; W = Wins; L = Losses; ERA = Earned run average; SO = Strikeouts

Mike Caldwell led the Padres in saves with 10.

Relief pitchers
Note: G = Games pitched; W = Wins; L = Losses; SV = Saves; ERA = Earned run average; SO = Strikeouts

Award winners

1973 Major League Baseball All-Star Game

Farm system

LEAGUE CHAMPIONS: Walla Walla

References

External links
 1973 San Diego Padres at Baseball Reference
 1973 San Diego Padres at Baseball Almanac

San Diego Padres seasons
San Diego Padres season
San Diego Padres